The 2021 Boston Uprising season was the Boston Uprising fourth season in the Overwatch League and their first under head coach Kim "Lori" Seung-hyun. Boston failed to qualify for any of the four midseason tournaments and missed out on the season playoffs for the third consecutive season.

Preceding offseason

Organizational changes 
In September 2020, assistant coach Rollon "Mini" Hamelin and analyst Jake "Spackle" Connell left the organization. A month later, the Uprising transitioned 2020 head coach Vytis "Mineral" Lasaitis into a management position. In his replacement, Boston signed Kim "Lori" Seung-hyun, who was previously the head coach of Korean Overwatch Contenders team World Game Star Phoenix, as the team's new head coach.

Roster changes 
The Uprising entered the free agency with three free agents, all three of which became free agents due to the Uprising not exercising the option to retain the player for another year.

Acquisitions 
The Uprising's first offseason acquisition was Hong "im37" Jun-ui, a damage player who had won the most recent Overwatch Contenders Korea title with WGS Phoenix while on a loan from Boston's academy team Uprising Academy, on November 12, 2020. The team's next acquisition was on December 2, 2020, with the signing of former Shanghai Dragons tank player Seo "Stand1" Ji-won. Two weeks later, the Uprising signed Terrance "Soon" Tarlier, a damage player who had played with the Paris Eternal from 2019 to 2020. In February, the Uprising signed two more players; on February 3, 2021, they signed Kim "Valentine" Byeong-ju, a damage player, and Kim "Faith" Hong-gyu, a support player, both of whom won Overwatch Contenders Korea on WGS Phoenix the previous season. Boston's final acquisition of the offseason came hours before the 2021 regular season began; on April 16, 2021, they signed Yun "GaeBullSsi" Young-sun, an off-tank player from their academy team Uprising Academy who would likely split playing time with the Uprising's established off-tank player Leyton "Punk" Gilchrist.

Departures 
The first departure of the team was tank player Park "Axxiom" Min-sub, who underwent a medical procedure in March 2020 and missed most of the 2020 season, on November 12, 2020. The Uprising parted ways with damage player Terrance "Soon" Tarlier, who had signed with the team earlier in the offseason, on April 6, 2021, due to visa issues.

None of the Uprising's free agents returned, all three of which signing with other teams, beginning with damage player Min "Jerry" Tae-hee signing with the Washington Justice on November 9, 2020. On December 7, 2020, support player Kobe "Halo" Hamand signed with collegiate team Maryville Esports. The following month, on January 12, 2021, tank player Michael "Mikeyy" Konicki signed with collegiate team Harrisburg University Storm.

Regular season 
The Uprising opened the season on April 24 with a 0–3 loss to the Los Angeles Gladiators in the May Melee qualifiers. The following day, they faced the Dallas Fuel; again, they team was swept 0–3. Already eliminated from May Melee contention, the team's final qualifier match was against the London Spitfire. After a back-and-forth match, the Uprising won their first match of the season with a 3–2 victory, giving them an overall 1–3 record.

For the June Joust qualifiers, Boston made a starting roster change, starting rookie Yun "GaeBullSsi" Young-sun as one of the team's tank players. The Uprising's first match was against the Toronto Defiant on May 22; they swept the Defiant 3–0 thanks in part to "solid support play" from support player Sang-min "Myunb0ng" Seo. The following day, they faced the Washington Justice; the Uprising swept the Justice 3–0 in what was the fastest match of the 2021 season up to that point. The team advanced to the June Joust regional knockouts, but fell in the first round to the Atlanta Reign.

Final roster

Standings

Game log

Regular season 

|2021 season schedule

Postseason

References 

Boston Uprising
Boston Uprising
Boston Uprising seasons